Mathew Joe Smith (born 23 July 1987) is a former English rugby league footballer who last played as a  for the Widnes Vikings in the Betfred Championship. He has played for the England Knights and England at international level.

He previously played for his home town club St Helens, spending time on loan from Saints at the Widnes Vikings, Celtic Crusaders and the Salford City Reds in the Super League. He moved to the Salford City Reds on a permanent deal, before moving to the Wigan Warriors and then back to his hometown club St Helens. He played for the Sheffield Eagles in the Betfred Championship on dual registration from St Helens during his second spell for the club. Smith has spent time on loan from the Catalans Dragons at the Warrington Wolves in the Super League. In December 2019 it was announced Smith had signed with championship club Widnes Vikings on a 1 year deal.

Background
Smith was born in St Helens, Merseyside, England.

Before converting to rugby league, Smith had a youth career with Premier League association football club Everton, occasionally appearing in the reserve team.

Club career

St Helens (2006–2010)
After coming through the junior ranks at St Helens, Smith made his Super League début for the club in 2006 in a match against Huddersfield Giants.

After a loan spell in the Championship with Widnes in 2008, Smith joined Celtic Crusaders on a season-long loan and played for the Welsh franchise in their first season in Super League. He later had a loan spell at Salford, for whom he eventually signed on a permanent basis.

After his Salford loan, Smith was recalled by his parent club St. Helens to play in the 2010 Super League Grand Final against Wigan, which St Helens lost despite a valiant performance by Smith.

Salford (2010–2012)
Following his successful loan spell at the club, Smith signed for Salford after the 2010 season and spent all of 2011 and the first half of 2012 with the club, before moving to the Wigan Warriors.

Wigan (2012–2016)
Two days after making his England début against The Exiles, Smith completed his switch to Wigan on 6 July 2012, after a successful negotiation between the clubs to the early release from his Salford contract. He made his début on 3 August 2012 against Hull FC, with Wigan winning the match 48–10.

In 2013, Matty received the number 7 jersey formerly worn by the likes of Thomas Leuluai, Adrian Lam, Shaun Edwards and Andy Gregory. Smith won the Lance Todd Trophy as man of the match in the 2013 Challenge Cup Final as Wigan defeated Hull F.C. 16–0 at Wembley Stadium. 

He was also part of the Wigan team that beat the Warrington Wolves 30–16 in the Super League Grand Final as Wigan earned the rare distinction of a Super League and Challenge Cup double. 

He ended the year with selection in the Super League Dream Team.

After goalkicker Pat Richards returned to the NRL at the end of the 2013 season, Matty Smith was given the goalkicking duties for Wigan. Smith also kicked 6 drop goals in the 2014 regular season for Wigan as well as earning a spot in the 2014 Super League Dream Team. On Friday 19 September, a night after Smith scored 21 points in the 57–4 playoff rout against the Huddersfield Giants, he signed a new four-year contract with the Warriors. 

He played in the 2014 Super League Grand Final defeat by St. Helens at Old Trafford.

He played in the 2015 Super League Grand Final defeat by the Leeds Rhinos at Old Trafford.

He played in the 2016 Super League Grand Final victory over the Warrington Wolves at Old Trafford.

Smith signed a new 2-year deal, On 11 October it was announced Matty had signed a 4-year deal with former club St. Helens for the beginning of the 2017 season.

St Helens (2017-2018)
On 23 June 2017, Smith kicked a long range field goal in the final second of the match against Salford to secure Saints a 25-24 victory.  St Helens had been down by three converted tries in the latter stages of the game before staging the comeback.

In 2018, he made seven appearances for St Helens as they won the League Leaders Shield but fell short of a grand final appearance losing to Warrington.

Les Catalans (2019)
In 2019, he joined Les Catalans Dragons.  On 5 December 2019, he was released by the club after making 16 appearances.  He also had a loan spell with Warrington in 2019.

International career
After a stellar 2014 season Smith was selected in England's 24-man squad for the 2014 Four Nations held in Australia and New Zealand. Smith played in all 3 of England's matches.
In 2015 Smith was selected in England's 24-man team for the end-of-year internationals but did not feature in the test against France or in the first two tests of the three-match test-series against New Zealand. He was a late call-up in the final test-match at the Wigan Warriors's home ground, DW Stadium, in place of Wigan teammate George Williams. He was influential in the final game delivering a man-of-the-match performance.

Personal life
In 2015, Smith set up a business with former Salford team mate Stefan Ratchford called Future Stars, which runs coaching sessions for junior rugby league players.

References

External links
Warrington Wolves profile
Catalans Dragons profile
St Helens profile
Profile at saints.org.uk
(archived by web.archive.org) Profile at reds.co.uk
SL profile
Widnes sign Saints' Smith on loan
We are still positive – McCormack
Tyrer topples the league leaders
Fellous extends Widnes loan deal
Super League XIV factfile
St Helens 30–24 Harlequins
Super League form guide 2011
New recruits strengthen Crusaders
Salford sign centre Tyrer on loan
Saints youngsters given contracts

1987 births
Living people
Catalans Dragons players
Crusaders Rugby League players
England Knights national rugby league team players
England national rugby league team players
English rugby league coaches
English rugby league players
Lance Todd Trophy winners
Rugby league hookers
Rugby league halfbacks
Rugby league players from St Helens, Merseyside
Salford Red Devils players
Sheffield Eagles players
St Helens R.F.C. players
Warrington Wolves players
Widnes Vikings players
Wigan Warriors players